This is a list of gunboat and gunvessel classes of the Royal Navy.

For gun-brigs see List of gun-brigs of the Royal Navy.

Steam gunboats

Wooden paddle gunboats (Indian service)

Wooden paddle gunboats (Great Lakes)

Iron paddle gunboat (Great Lakes)

 Mowhawk (1843)

Iron paddle despatch vessels/gunboats

  (1855)

Wooden screw gunboats

 Gleaner (or Pelter) class 

  

  (1855)

  

 (or Bruizer) 
 (cancelled)
 (cancelled)
 (cancelled)
 (cancelled)

Composite screw gunboats
The gunboats designed from 1870 onwards were of composite construction, i.e. they had an iron keel, stem and stern posts, and iron framing, with wooden planking retained over the iron frames.

 

 Albacore class

Bramble class

Armoured gunboats

The only ironclads of gunboat size were three largely experimental (and unsuccessful) vessels ordered in 1864. The first two were towed to Bermuda (being considered unsatisfactory to sail under their own power) where they served as harbour vessels.  Vixen was the first twin-screw vessel built for the Royal Navy, and Waterwitch employed a form of water pump propulsion.

Iron coastal gunboats

  (1867)

  (1870)

  – Gadfly, Pincher, Griper and Tickler are sometimes referred to as the Gadfly class.

  (or River class) (1876)

Steel coastal gunboats
  (1881)

  (1882)

  (1882)

Torpedo ram
 Polyphemus class 

Hull 2 (cancelled 10 November 1882 before being named)
Adventure (cancelled 12 August 1885)

Torpedo gunboats

  (1887)

Steel gunboats

  (1898)

River gunboats

 (1915)
The Insect-class gunboats were a class of small, but well-armed Royal Navy ships designed for use in shallow rivers or inshore. Several of them took also part in World War II.
 : built by Ailsa shipbuilding, scrapped Singapore, 1947
 : built by Ailsa shipbuilding, flagship of Rear Admiral, Yangtze (RAY), sold in March 1939.
 : built by Barclay Curle, sunk by Japanese bombs on 21 December 1941.
 : built by Barclay Curle, sold for scrap in 1949, the last surviving member of the class.
 : built by Barclay Curle, heavily damaged by bombs on 29 June 1941; used as target by Royal Navy and sunk off Cyprus 1944.
 : built by Barclay Curle, scrapped September 1928.
 : built by Lobnitz, damaged by U-boat 21 October 1941, declared total loss, and then used as anti-aircraft platform. Scrapped 1946
 : built by Lobnitz, sunk on 12 May 1941 off Tobruk during World War II, then used as an anti-aircraft position
 : built by William Doxford & Sons, sold in January 1940 and subsequently scrapped.
 : built by William Doxford & Sons, scuttled in Hong Kong 1941, captured and repaired by the Japanese and renamed Suma, sunk by mines in Yangtze River on 19 March 1945.
 : built by Wood, Skinner & Co, scrapped in 1948.
  built by Wood, Skinner & Co, briefly flagship of the British Pacific Fleet, expended as a target 1946

Steam gunvessels

Wooden paddle gunvessels

  (1831) – steam vessel rated from 1837 as a first-class steam gunvessel

  (1831) – steam vessels reclassified in 1844 as first-class steam gunvessels

  (1832) – steam vessels reclassified in 1844 as first-class steam gunvessels

  (1834) – steam vessels reclassified in 1844 as first-class steam gunvessels

  (1840) – steam vessels reclassified in 1844 as second class steam gunvessels

  (1844) – steam vessel reclassified in 1844 as a first-class steam gunvessel

  (1845) – steam vessel reclassified in 1844 as a first-class steam gunvessel

Iron paddle gunvessels

  

  (1845)

 Bloodhound class 

 Myrmidon class (1845)

 Grappler class (1845)

  (1850)

NB. A third vessel of the class was retained by Prussia.

Wooden screw gunvessels

This section includes two early iron-hulled screw gunvessels ordered in May 1845, which in other respects were half-sisters to two wooden-hulled gunvessels ordered at the same time. The four vessels comprised the first-class gunvessels Rifleman (wooden hulled) and Sharpshooter (iron hulled), and the second-class gunvessels Teazer (wooden hulled) and Minx (iron hulled). Further vessels ordered later to the same design were either cancelled or built to very different concepts. Rifleman and Sharpshooter were re-classed as sloops in 1854.

 Rifleman class (wooden half-sisters to iron-hulled Sharpshooter)

Sepoy (cancelled 1849)
Cossack (cancelled 1849)
Sharpshooter class (iron half-sister to wooden Rifleman)

 Teazer class (wooden-hulled half-sisters to iron-hulled Minx)

Boxer (cancelled 1849)
Biter (cancelled 1849)
Minx class (iron half-sister to wooden Teazer)

  – 4 first-class gunvessels were ordered in 1852–1853; while still building, they were re-rated as third-class sloops in 1854 and will be found under the list of corvette and sloop classes of the Royal Navy.
  – originally rated as "despatch vessels", these six ships were re-classed as second-class gunvessels in 1856.

 

 

 Philomel (or Ranger) class

Alban (cancelled)

Humber (cancelled)
Undine (cancelled)
Rye (cancelled)
Portia (cancelled)
Discovery (cancelled)
 Cormorant (or Eclipse) class (1860)

Tartarus (cancelled 1864)
Pegasus (cancelled 1863)
Albatross (cancelled 1863)
Guernsey (cancelled 1863)
  (1867)

Composite screw gunvessels
The gunvessels designed from 1867 onwards were of composite construction, i.e. they had an iron keel, stem and stern posts, and iron framing, with wooden planking retained over the iron frames.

  (1867)

  (1872)

  (1874)

 

  (1879)

  (1882)

 
Like the preceding Arab to Dolphin classes, these were designed by Nathaniel Barnaby; they were re-classed as screw sloops on 26 November 1884.

Steel torpedo-and-gunvessels

  (1885)

Notes

References
 
 

Gunboats and Gunvessels
 
 
Royal Navy
Royal Navy